Gingival fibroma is a cutaneous condition that may be observed with another condition, tuberous sclerosis.

See also 
 Eruptive lingual papillitis
 List of cutaneous conditions

References 

Conditions of the mucous membranes